Olukbaşı can refer to the following villages in Turkey:

 Olukbaşı, Acıpayam
 Olukbaşı, Bozdoğan
 Olukbaşı, Taşköprü